Pseudochromis sankeyi, the striped dottyback, is a species of ray-finned fish from the Western Indian Ocean which is a member of the family Pseudochromidae. It occasionally makes its way into the aquarium trade. It grows to a size of 7 cm in length. The specific name honours the British collector and wholesaler of marine fish Richard D. Sankey, who gave Roger Lubbock study specimens.

References

sankeyi
Taxa named by Roger Lubbock
Fish described in 1975